In linguistics, syncretism exists when functionally distinct occurrences of a single lexeme, morph or phone are identical in form. The term arose in historical linguistics, referring to the convergence of morphological forms within inflectional paradigms. In such cases, a former distinction has been 'syncretized'. The term syncretism is often used when a fairly regular pattern can be observed across a paradigm.

Syncretism is a specific form of linguistic homophony. Homophony refers to any instance of two words or morphemes with the same pronunciation (form) but different meaning. Syncretism is a type of homophony that occurs within a specific paradigm in which the syntax would require separate forms. Accidental homophony does occur in paradigms, however, and linguist Sebastian Bank of the University of Leipzig makes the distinction between accidental homophony and syncretism in paradigms through natural classes. When a set of identical paradigmatic forms are connected by a feature in common, and a native speaker cannot tell the difference between the forms, this is said to be syncretism.

Syncretism can arise through either phonological or morphological change. Baerman et al. call these two sources of syncretism "blind phonological change" and "morphosyntactic readjustment". In the case of phonological change, originally distinct forms change to be pronounced identically, so that their distinctness is lost. This is also an example of syncretism manifested in lexemes.

Some scholars, according to Baerman et al., purport that blind phonological change should only be considered to yield homophony, not syncretism. This distinction between the two sources of syncretism is important in theory, but is harder to maintain de facto.

In the case of morphological change, one form stops being used and is replaced by the other. This change can be exemplified by the syncretism in Latin's third-declension nouns, whose nouns take the same form in nominative and vocative cases.

Forms of syncretism 
Baerman et al. identify three forms of syncretism. These are simple syncretism, nested syncretism, and contrary syncretism. Simple syncretism occurs when a minimum of two cells in a paradigm are syncretic. Nested syncretism occurs when more than two cells in a paradigm are syncretic to the same form. Contrary syncretism occurs when there are multiple cases of simple syncretism, in which each case in the paradigm of the simple syncretism is separate from the others.

In the chart above a model of simple syncretism is shown in the singular and plural forms of the second person subject pronoun in English. There is another example in the chart of simple syncretism in the masculine and feminine third person plural subject pronouns, both realized as they. Together these two cases of syncretism are an example of contrary syncretism.

The chart below shows a model of nested syncretism, in which more than one cell in the paradigm of subjunctive verb conjugation in Brazilian Portuguese is realized as the same form, "seja."

Stump, in his 2001 book Inflectional Morphology: A Theory of Paradigm Structure, identifies four distinct types of syncretism. This model is called directional syncretism, as it refers to the direction in which the syncretism occurs and progresses. The four directions of syncretism are unidirectional, bidirectional, unstipulated, and symmetrical.

Unidirectional syncretism is the concept that the form of one cell in the paradigm is mapped onto another cell. This is exemplified through the exploration of accusative forms of neutral words in Indo-European languages. In Indo-European languages that have the neutral gender, the nominative and accusative forms of neuter words tend to be the same. The accusative case is the marked case (meaning the presence of accusative implies the presence of nominative, while the nominative case can exist in a language without the accusative), and so it can be assumed that the form of the nominative neuter word was mapped onto the accusative form. As in the Slovak word for "word", slovo, which is the same in both nominative and accusative, while masculine animate and feminine words change from case to case, as shown in the chart below.

Stump's next form of syncretism is bidirectional. This is similar to unidirectional, but differs in that in some cases the mapping is from one direction, and in other cases the mapping is from the other direction. This is exemplified in Russian in Genitive Singular and Nominative Plural forms. In some cases it is realized as G.Sg -> N.Pl and in other cases it is realized as N.Pl -> G.Sg.

Unstipulated syncretism occurs when syncretism occurs in a direction that is not quite so obvious, but the syncretized forms are connected by a natural class of feature. An example of this is the syncretism among German genitive and dative, masculine and neutral, nominal elements, where the only forms not syncretized in this paradigm are feminine, so the natural class is [-fem]. This is shown in the chart below.

The final category in Stump's four type syncretism model is that of symmetrical syncretism. This category has the least defined boundaries, and is defined more as the syncretism that occurs when there is no directional syncretism and no evident natural class.

Dieter Wunderlich, in Explorations in Nominal Inflection argues against Stump's four-type syncretism model, asking "Is There Any Need for the Concept of Directional Syncretism?" Wunderlich proposes that all instances of supposed directional syncretism, be it uni-or bi-directional, are in actuality cases of unstipulated or symmetrical syncretism.

English 
In English, syncretism led to the loss of case marking and the stabilization of word order. For example, the nominative and accusative forms of you are the same, whereas he/him, she/her, etc., have different forms depending on grammatical case.

Another English example for syncretism can be observed in most English verb paradigms: there is no morphological distinction between the past participle and the passive participle, and, often, the past tense.
The syncretism observed here differs from the lexical syncretism observed in English personal pronouns in as much that the syncretism manifests itself in the suffix or stem change in the case of walked and won, respectively.

Ingvaeonic languages 

In the Ingvaeonic languages, a subgroup of the West Germanic languages, an important case of syncretism developed in the inflection of verbs, where the forms for the three plural persons became identical. Such "unified plural" languages contrasted with the more southern Old Dutch and Old High German, which still had three distinct forms for each, e.g. In the modern languages, this distinction remains an important isogloss separating Low German from Dutch and the High German languages.

Latin 
In Latin, the nominative and vocative of third-declension nouns have the same form (e.g. rēx 'king' is both nominative and vocative singular), distributing syncretism in case marking. Another observation is the distinction between dative and ablative, which is present in singular (e.g., puellae 'girl-DAT.SG' and puella 'girl-ABL.SG'), but not anymore in plural (e.g., puellis 'girl-DAT.PL/girl-ABL.PL'.

Other languages 
In the Finnic languages, such as Finnish and Estonian, there is syncretism between the accusative and genitive singular case forms, and the nominative and accusative plural case forms.

Accounts for syncretism 
There exists a cross-linguistic typological investigation of syncretism ("The Syntax-Morphology Interface: A Study of Syncretism" by Baerman, Brown and Corbett, 2005). This study explores the logical space of syncretism, i.e., what features may be involved, and what sort of patterns do these describe. It also provided a diverse sampling of the world's languages.

Other studies on syncretism include "A Distributed Morphology Approach to Syncretism in Russian Noun inflection" (Müller 2004) in which Müller provides a systematic account for Russian noun inflection.

References

Bibliography

 
 
 

Linguistic morphology
Syncretism